Rabih Mohammad Osman (born 1 July 1975) is a Lebanese football coach and former player who is the head coach of  club Riada Wal Adab.

Club career 
Osman began his career at Harakat Shabab, before joining Salam Zgharta in 1999. Following his third season at the club, he received offers from German clubs Hamburger SV and 1860 Munich; however, Salam were only willing to sell Osman for a large sum, and the transfers fell through.

In 2002, Osman moved to Olympic Beirut for a then-national record sum of $30,000; he remained at the club when they changed their name to Tripoli. Between 2007 and 2009, Osman played for cross-city rivals Egtmaaey; he joined Salam Zgharta in 2009, with whom he played until 2011.

International career 
Osman's performances with Salam Zgharta in 1999 caught the attention of the Lebanon national team coach, who called him up for friendly games in preparation for the 2000 AFC Asian Cup.

Managerial career 
Osman coached Majd Tripoli, before taking the helm of Lebanese Third Division team Riada Wal Adab in September 2020. He was also coach of youth club Stadium Academy Football (SAF).

Personal life 
In January 2014, Osman was injured by a gunshot wound to the leg due to a traffic-related altercation.

Honours
Individual
 Lebanese Premier League Team of the Season: 1999–2000

Notes

References

External links
 
 
 

1975 births
Living people
Sportspeople from Tripoli, Lebanon
Lebanese footballers
Association football forwards
Harakat Al Shabab SC players
Salam Zgharta FC players
Olympic Beirut players
AC Tripoli players
Al Egtmaaey SC players
Lebanese Premier League players
Lebanon international footballers
Lebanese football managers
Riada Wal Adab Club managers